Julio Leiva Molina (born 21 January 1960) is the past commander-in-chief of the Chilean Navy.

He was the Commander In Chief since June 18, 2017 to June 18,2021.

He has quickly climbed the ranks in the Chilean naval high commande since 2010 when he was appointed a Commodore.

He was appointed as a Counter admiral in 2011 and was he was awarded the rank of Vice admiral by the Government in 2015.

On June 2, 2017 he was appointed as the new commander in chief of the Chilean Navy and was promoted to a Admiral 16 days later on June 18, he had been part of the high command for only 7 years by that point.

References 

Living people
Chilean admirals
1960 births
Arturo Prat Naval Academy alumni
People from Santiago
20th-century Chilean Navy personnel
21st-century Chilean Navy personnel